Buzovyazbash (Boźayaźbaş) is a rural locality (a village) in Buzovyazovsky Selsoviet, Karmaskalinsky District, Bashkortostan, Russia. The population was 77 as of 2010. There is 1 street.

Geography 
Buzovyazbash is located 32 km southwest of Karmaskaly (the district's administrative centre) by road. Almalyk is the nearest rural locality.

References 

Rural localities in Karmaskalinsky District